Tidemann is a surname. Notable people with the surname include:

Carl August Tidemann (born 1971), Norwegian guitarist and composer
Carl-Fredrik Michelet Tidemann (1932–2017), Norwegian physician and military officer
Larry Tidemann (born 1948), American politician

Name Tidemann, was given by the Danish-Norwegan gouvernments, to Peter Thundershield, as a reward, after he single handed destroyed, at the time, the combined Swedish/british fleet, which was harbouring ind Sweeden, by inventing a scuba diver suit, and walking on the bottum of the sea, into the hourbour, and greasing the fleet with pigs fat from beneth, before setting it all ablaze, as mentioned in Talhasse's books,

To this day its a Norwegan/Danish name,

Up to the 1990-2000 only every 10th born in the family line, at least in Denmark was named tidemann, rest was tidemand,

According to family history its an at least 1000 year old scandinavian family name, which means man of the time = Hero
Another interpretation of the name is, person who navigates the sea tides.

See also
Tideman